François Mitterrand (1916–1996) was the President of France from 1981 until 1995.

Mitterrand may also refer to:

Relatives of François Mitterrand
 Danielle Mitterrand (1924–2011) wife 
 Frédéric Mitterrand (born 1947) nephew, former Minister of Culture and Communication
 Henri Mitterand (1928–2021), French academic, author, critic, and editor
 Jean-Christophe Mitterrand (born 1946) son and political advisor
 Olivier Mitterrand (born 1943) nephew, business executive

Others
 Jacques Mitterrand (1908–1991) French freemason and leftwing politician

Similar spelling
 Alexandre Millerand (1859–1943) President of France 1920 to 1924